Gerd Andres (born 8 April 1951 in Wirges, Rhineland-Palatinate) is a German politician and member of the SPD. From 1987 to 2009 he was a member of the Bundestag.

Literature

External links

References

1951 births
Living people
People from Westerwaldkreis
Members of the Bundestag for Lower Saxony
Officers Crosses of the Order of Merit of the Federal Republic of Germany
Members of the Bundestag 2005–2009
Members of the Bundestag 2002–2005
Members of the Bundestag 1998–2002
Members of the Bundestag 1994–1998
Members of the Bundestag 1990–1994
Members of the Bundestag 1987–1990
Members of the Bundestag for the Social Democratic Party of Germany